The Syracuse Law Review, established in 1949, is a legal research and writing program for student editors at Syracuse University College of Law and a national forum for legal scholars who contribute to it.  The editorial board publishes four Law Review issues annually, one of which is the Annual Survey of New York Law.

Contributors to the Syracuse Law Review have included renowned scholars such as President of the United States Joe Biden, U.S. Supreme Court Justices Clarence Thomas and Stephen Breyer, former New York Court of Appeals Chief Judge Judith Kaye, Erwin Chemerinsky, Owen Fiss, Akhil Reed Amar, Roscoe Pound, Richard Epstein, former director of the FBI J. Edgar Hoover, and Ronald Rotunda.

The Law Review also publishes six articles completed by student members during their first year of law review membership.  In 2007, the Law Review hosted a panel of legal scholars and foreign policy experts for its annual Symposium, titled "A Nuclear Iran: The Legal Implications of a Preemptive National Security Strategy."  The 59th Volume was recently cited by the Supreme Court of the United States in the Second Amendment case McDonald v. City of Chicago. In 2016, the Syracuse Law Review hosted the National Conference of Law Reviews.

History
The first issue of the Syracuse Law Review was in spring 1949. At that time, $2.00 bought a subscription to the Syracuse Law Review. The new bi-annual law journal offered articles and current commentary by members of the judiciary, practicing lawyers, and law teachers and students. The new law review delved into topics of interest and importance to the legal profession and recent developments discussing noteworthy recent cases. Among the 14 leading articles in Volume 1 were articles on judicial rule-making, civil investigations by the Federal Bureau of Investigation, law and equity, and legal thinking. Authors in the inaugural volume included J. Edgar Hoover, the legendary director of the FBI, and Roscoe Pound, the noted author and dean of Harvard Law School.

In 1962 the Law Review began publishing the Annual Survey of New York Law. In his foreword, Dean Ralph E. Kharas paid tribute to the other law schools in New York state and accepted the torch from the New York University Law Review which had published the Annual Survey since 1947. The Annual Survey, he wrote: "has made a substantial contribution to the Empire State lawyers in their task of keeping up with the law.".

Over the years, the judges of the New York Court of Appeals regarded the Survey as a useful record and reflection of the nation's common law tradition. The Survey chronicled developments with statewide, national and international implications, marked the law's progression and served as an annual "report card" for New York's courts and judges.

In 2021, Hilda Frimpong became the first black student to lead the review.

Research and recent Volumes
Over the years, scholars' articles have proposed changes and improvements to the law. To date, even the United States Supreme Court referred to this publication, citing the Review in at least 11 different court opinions.

Likewise, the Law Review has contributed to scholarship and served as a record of the events at Syracuse University College of Law and the university itself by sponsoring symposia, publishing commencement speeches, distinguished service awards, and the dedication of new buildings.

As part of Volume 60, the Syracuse Law Review published a Winter 2010 Symposium book that included nine prominent authors who considered the recent United States Supreme Court decision Caperton v. A.T. Massey Coal Co., the soundness of the majority and dissenting opinions, and the implication of the decision on judicial ethics.  The Symposium book featured articles written by James Sample; James Bopp and Anita Woudenberg; Andrew Frey and Jeffrey Berger; Roy Schotland; Ronald D. Rotunda; Steven Lubet; Bruce Green; and Elizabeth Wydra.

The June 2016, Vol. 66, No. 3, Issue of the Syracuse Law Review was a specially organized Symposium book titled: Richard A. Matasar Symposium, The Future of Legal and Higher Education. Matasar, Tulane University Senior Vice President for Strategic Initiatives and Institutional Effectiveness, has written extensively on change in higher education. 
The Symposium event was hosted at Dineen Hall and attended by a group of law school deans and former deans. The event was inspired by Matasar's scholarship on legal and higher education, and was co-chaired by Former College of Law Dean Hannah Arterian and Former USC Gould School of Law Dean Robert Rasmussen. The Issue included the transcript from Matasar's question and answer at the Symposium, and featured more than a dozen original scholarly works from noted law school deans and professors. Arterian's essay, "Engaging the Challenge to Legal and Higher Education: How Richard Matasar Calls the Questions," was included in the publication, along with an original article from Matasar.

Members
Students are selected for Law Review membership based on academic ranking or success in an open writing competition held at the conclusion of the first year.  All prospective members, including those who would be offered membership based on academic ranking, must successfully complete a form & accuracy examination, demonstrating the prospective members knowledge and comfort with the Bluebook: A Uniform System of Citation.  Members must demonstrate mastery of legal research and writing skills by submitting scholarly articles of publishable quality, of which 6 winning articles and 2 alternates are selected for publication in the following volume.

References

External links

American law journals
Law Review
Publications established in 1952
Quarterly journals
English-language journals
Law journals edited by students